Misodema is a genus of tropiduchid planthoppers in the family Tropiduchidae. There are at least two described species in Misodema.

Species
These two species belong to the genus Misodema:
 Misodema dubia Caldwell, 1945
 Misodema reticulata (Melichar, 1906)

References

Auchenorrhyncha genera
Articles created by Qbugbot
Elicini